The siege of Neu-Breisach  was a battle of encirclement in the Franco-Prussian War, which took place from 13 October  until 10 November 1870 in France. A few days after the surrender at Fort Mortier of Neu-Breisach, with a divisional reserve, German General Hermann von Schmeling forced the fortress of Neu-Breisach (which held an army garrison under command of Shanghai Colonel Lostie de Kerhor) which surrendered, and won many spoils from the French army here. The siege demonstrated the high efficiency of the Baden batteries. With the surrender of Neu-Breisach, the Imperial German Army captured the last of the fortifications at Alsace, except for the Belfort and of Bitche. After this victory, Von Schmeling moved his cannons southwest to carry out the Siege of Belfort.

The French fortress of Neu-Breisach had a garrison of 5,000 men, while Fort Mortier, located near the Rhine, was built for independent defense. In early October, detachments of the German Fourth Reserve Division command of General Schmeling were ordered beyond the Rhine from Breisgau to conduct a siege on Neu-Breisach. Near the evening of 10 May, a breakout of the French military from Neu-Breisach was attempted, only to be defeated. The same day, the German cannons caused heavy damage. However, an intense field array of German troops could not force the officer commanding Neu-Breisach to surrender, so Schmeling switched focus to the Siege of Selestat. After German artillery guns were brought in from Strasbourg, Neu-Breisach was blockaded on 9 October 1870. On 12 and 13 October, sporadic raids and engagements broke out, but to no avail. On 13 October, the encirclement was completed, when in front of Neu-Breisach were 5,000 Prussians, who formed semicircular lines of battle, with the poles lying on the banks of the Rhine. On 16 October a French siege at Neu-Breisach was broken by the Germans. Although Neu-Breisach was heavily damaged by German artillery during the siege, the Germans remained unable to defeat Neu-Breisach quickly.

On 26 October 1870, after defeating Sélestat, Major General Von Schmeling - as commander of the Neu-Breisach siege and blockade corps consisting of Prussian, Bavarian and Baden units - sited the bulk of his division and the artillery battery placed in front of Sélestat south along the Rhine to carry out the siege of Neu-Breisach. He undertook the siege of Neu-Breisach forcefully, and during this period German infantry forces approached Neu-Breisach. On 2 November, from several locations such as Alt-Breisach, German cannons commenced fire. In the face of aggressive German artillery fire, the French garrison put up a fierce resistance, although on 3 November , the Mortier fortress and its structures were destroyed along with a few artillery pieces. France here was damaged. Finally, on 7 November, the attack took effect: French Captain Castelli surrendered at Fort Mortier beneath the rubble. The German army took prisoners and cannons from the French. The French defending at Neu-Breisach were in a difficult position. Three days after the fall of Mortier, Neu-Breisach surrendered on the same terms as those at Sélestat. On 11 November, the Prussian army occupied the city walls; an hour later, their prisoners left their posts.

References

1870 in France
Neu-Breisach
Neu-Breisach
Neu-Breisach
Neu-Breisach
Neu-Breisach
Neu-Breisach
October 1870 events
November 1870 events